Johannes Gropengeter, O.S.A. was a Roman Catholic prelate who served as Auxiliary Bishop of Minden (1499–1508).

Biography
Johannes Gropengeter was ordained a priest in the Order of Saint Augustine. On 9 Jan 1499, he was appointed during the papacy of Pope Alexander VI as Auxiliary Bishop of Minden, and Titular Bishop of Paneade. He served as Auxiliary Bishop of Minden until his resignation on 25 Jan 1508.

References 

15th-century German Roman Catholic bishops
16th-century German Roman Catholic bishops
Bishops appointed by Pope Alexander VI
Augustinian bishops